In many Western Christian traditions Midnight Mass is the first liturgy of Christmastide that is celebrated on the night of Christmas Eve, traditionally beginning at midnight when Christmas Eve gives way to Christmas Day. This popular Christmas custom is a jubilant celebration of the mass or service of worship in honour of the Nativity of Jesus; even many of those Christian denominations that do not regularly employ the word mass uniquely use the term "Midnight Mass" for their Christmas Eve liturgy as it includes the celebration of Holy Communion.

History

The tradition of a midnight Vigil on the eve of Christmas began in the East, and was observed in the late fourth century in Jerusalem by a Christian woman named Egeria on the night of January 5. The tradition reached the Western world in the year 430 under Pope Sixtus III in the Basilica of St Mary Major.

By the twelfth century, the practice of midnight Mass had become more widespread as all priests had been granted the faculty of celebrating three Masses on Christmas Day (previously reserved to the Pope), provided the three different propers were celebrated at their appropriate times of midnight, dawn and day.

Traditions

Roman Catholicism
Roman Catholics have traditionally celebrated Midnight Mass with church services beginning at midnight. Since 2009 the Vatican has conducted a liturgically similar Christmas Eve Mass earlier in the day, first at 10:00 pm, designated a Mass during the Night, then subsequently earlier in the evening. 

In Splendoribus Sanctorum is used for the Communion chant during traditional Catholic midnight mass.

Lutheranism

Lutherans often observe midnight Mass in addition to Christmas Vespers and Matins. In his famous work, Cérémonies et coutumes religieuses de tous les peuples du monde, Bernard Picart describes the Lutheran Midnight Mass:

Anglicanism

Churches of the Anglican Communion also traditionally celebrate Midnight Communion for Christmas at 11 or 11:30 pm.

Methodism

Methodist observations vary as many hold services at 11 p.m. which involve the ringing of church bells when the stroke of midnight is reached.

Presbyterianism

The Church of Scotland observes a service just before midnight which involves the singing of carols, although it does not include Mass and is called a Watchnight service (held elsewhere on New Year's Eve).

Eastern Christian traditions

While Midnight Mass is not observed in Eastern traditions, All-Night Vigil is common on Christmas Eve and involves the celebration of Matins, the hour which is traditionally observed at midnight.

See also

 Misa de Gallo, a version of the Midnight Mass in many Spanish-speaking countries
 Pasterka, a Midnight Mass celebrated in Poland
 Plygain, a Welsh service of worship taking place on Christmas morning
 Watchnight service, a service of worship observed on New Year's Eve
 Messe de minuit pour Noël H.9 by Marc-Antoine Charpentier

References

Nativity of Jesus in worship and liturgy
Mass (liturgy)
Anglican liturgy
Catholic liturgy
Lutheran liturgy and worship